Fukuoka Prefecture held a gubernatorial election on April 8, 2007 as part of the 16th unified local elections. Incumbent Asou Wataru won the election.

Candidates 
 Asou Wataru, the Independent incumbent governor.
 Inatomi Shouji, supported by the Democratic Party of Japan and the Social Democratic Party.
 Jirano Eiichi, former teacher supported by the Japanese Communist Party

Results 

 
 
 
 
 
 

2007 elections in Japan
Gubernatorial elections in Japan
April 2007 events in Japan
Politics of Fukuoka Prefecture